MVO may refer to:

 Member of the Royal Victorian Order, a British order of knighthood (post-nominal letters: MVO)
 Montserrat Volcano Observatory, an observatory on the Caribbean island of Montserrat
 Marovo language
 MVO is a code of Manwath Road, a railway station in Maharashtra state of India